The 2021 Colgate Raiders football team represented Colgate University in the 2021 NCAA Division I FCS football season. The Raiders, led by 1st-year head coach Stan Dakosty, played their home games at Crown Field at Andy Kerr Stadium as a member of the Patriot League.

Schedule

References

Colgate
Colgate Raiders football seasons
Colgate Raiders football